MalSec (an abbreviation of "Malicious Security") is a splinter faction of Anonymous that pledges to use hacktivism ethically to empower people. The group has said that they want to turn away from their trickster ways and become a more forthright force fighting censorship on the internet and improving the security of the net with free pentests.

References

Anonymous (hacker group)
Hacker groups